Shashin Shūhō (Japanese: 写真周报; Weekly Photographical Journal) was an illustrated propaganda magazine of the Cabinet Intelligence Department which was published in Japan between 1938 and 1945. It was one of the most successful propaganda publications of Japan.

History and profile
Shashin Shūhō was launched by the Cabinet Intelligence Department in 1938, and its first issue appeared on 16 February 1938. It was employed by the Japanese government for propaganda purposes and featured the news about the Japan's war activities in World War II. Its contents were accompanied by photographs which were mostly taken by the Nippon Kōbō collaborators, including Ken Domon and Ihei Kimura. The magazine came out weekly which reached the peak circulation level distributing 500,000 copies in 1943. It folded after the publication of the issue 374–375 on 11 July 1945.

The magazine issues have been archived by different institutions, including National Archives of Singapore and the British Museum.

References

External links

1938 establishments in Japan
1945 disestablishments in Japan
Defunct political magazines published in Japan
Fascist newspapers and magazines
Magazines established in 1938
Magazines disestablished in 1945
Weekly magazines published in Japan
Propaganda newspapers and magazines
Magazines published in Tokyo
State media